The Space Tourism Society is a California 501(c)3 non-profit organization founded in 1996 by John Spencer, a former member of the board of directors of the National Space Society, with the goal of promoting space tourism.

Their stated goal, as quoted from their website, is: "To conduct the research, build public desire, and acquire the financial and political power to make space tourism available to as many people as possible, as soon as possible."

The STS is based in the USA and has chapters in Japan, Norway, Canada, Malaysia, India, Russia, and the United Kingdom. It is an organization member of the Alliance for Space Development.

History
, the president of the society, John Spencer, is designing a  space yacht aimed at cruising in Earth orbit.

See also
 Commercial Astronaut
 Private spaceflight
 Quasi Universal Intergalactic Denomination

References

Further reading

 The Popular Science Monthly
 Feasibility Study and Future Projections of Suborbital Space Tourism at the Example of Virgin Galactic by Matthias Otto
 Space tourism: do you want to go? by John Spencer and Karen L. Rugg
 Space enterprise: living and working offworld in the 21st century by Philip Robert Harris
 Worldwide Destinations and Companion Book of Cases Set by =Brian G. Boniface and Chris Cooper

External links
 Space tourism Society

Space tourism
Space organizations
Organizations established in 1996